can refer to:
 William Martin Leake, English soldier and writer
 William Ralph Martin-Leake, English rugby player